Purim Torah is  humorous and satirical comments in the learned style of talmudic or halakhic comments customarily read, recited from memory or authored on or for the Jewish holiday of Purim. Purim Torah can be simple or elaborate.

History 
Parodies of Jewish life and the world have been found as early as the twelfth century. In some examples, the boundary between humor and irreverence is very thin. An example of such is the fourteenth century Masekhet Purim by Kalonymus ben Kalonymus, condemned by many scholars.

Purim Torah authors, often displaying an amazing grasp of Jewish knowledge, playfully use some of the far-fetched methods of Talmudic logic and Biblical exegesis in order to reach absurd conclusions. Another popular method is "play on words" where a reasonable word or phrase is purposefully misinterpreted as something absurd that sounds similar.  For example the verse in the Megilla that states "Vashti made a feast for the women" sounds similar (in Hebrew) to "Vashti was born of two women".

Ashkenazi culture has a variation of the Purim Torah that is acted out, often with elaborate costumes and is referred to as a Purim Shpiel, from the Yiddish for play.

Talmudic sources
Eliezer Segal points to a passage in the Talmud as the first suggestion of a  Purim Torah. In a passage on Hulin 139b, a sage offers up a series of interesting puns in order to find allusions to characters from the Purim story in the Torah. Others such as Israel Davidson state that while there is humor present in the Talmud, calling any part of it a parody is simply untrue.

See also
Purim humor
Purim rabbi

References

Purim
Jewish comedy and humor
Torah
Hebrew words and phrases